Megalobulimus oblongus, also known as Strophocheilus oblongus, is a species of air-breathing land snail, a terrestrial pulmonate gastropod mollusk in the family Strophocheilidae.

Distribution 
This species occurs in:
 Brazil
 Venezuela (Also known as "Guácara")
 Barbados and other Lesser Antilles locations
Uruguay
Peru

References

oblongus
Gastropods described in 1774